CD-160 or No. 160 was a Type D escort ship of the Imperial Japanese Navy during World War II.

History
She was laid down on 27 January 1945 at the Harima shipyard of Harima Shipyard Company Ltd. for the benefit of the Imperial Japanese Navy and launched on 10 April 1945. On 16 August 1945, she was completed and commissioned, one day after Japan's unconditional surrender on 15 August 1945. On 5 October 1945, she was struck from the Navy List. She served as a repatriation vessel after the war until 9 August 1947 when she was ceded to Great Britain. On 2 February 1948, she was scrapped at Maizuru.

References

1945 ships
Ships built by IHI Corporation
Type D escort ships